The White Dove is a 1960 Czechoslovak film directed by František Vláčil. It is Vláčil's first full-length film.

Plot
The film is based on the short story "Susanne" by Otakar Kirchner: a dove belongs to a German girl, Susanne. The dove gets lost on its way from France to the Baltic Sea and ends up in Prague. The dove is shot by a crippled boy, Michal. It is found by a sculptor, Martin, who brings it to Michal. Michal helps the dove to recover and he befriends Martin. Martin finds from where the dove comes and sends there a picture of the bird. Susanne, is sad from the dove's absence but realises that the dove will return. Michal recovers together with the dove but does not want to give her up. Martin eventually convinces Michal to release the dove.

Cast
Kateřina Irmanovová as Susanne Kleist
Karel Smyczek as Michal
Anna Pitašová as Michal's mother
Václav Irmanov as Martin
Gustav Püttjer as an old man

Reception

Accolades

References

External links
 

1960 films
Czech drama films
1960s Czech-language films
Czechoslovak drama films
Films directed by František Vláčil
1960s Czech films